The Osage Creek Bridge is a historic bridge in southern Benton County, Arkansas. It has a lattice guardrail on one side, a feature that rarely survives on bridges of this type. The bridge was built in 1911 by an unknown builder, and is one of about 60 Pratt truss bridges in the state.

The bridge was listed on the National Register of Historic Places in 1988, and was delisted in 2022.

According to Bridgehunter.com, it was moved to facilitate a new bridge over Osage Creek in 2014 and scrapped in 2015.

See also
List of bridges documented by the Historic American Engineering Record in Arkansas
List of bridges on the National Register of Historic Places in Arkansas
National Register of Historic Places listings in Benton County, Arkansas

References

External links

Road bridges on the National Register of Historic Places in Arkansas
Bridges completed in 1911
1911 establishments in Arkansas
Historic American Engineering Record in Arkansas
National Register of Historic Places in Benton County, Arkansas
Pratt truss bridges in the United States
Iron bridges in the United States
Former National Register of Historic Places in Arkansas
Transportation in Benton County, Arkansas
2015 disestablishments in Arkansas